Banteer GAA is a Gaelic Athletic Association club which is based in the village of Banteer in the North West of County Cork, Ireland. The club plays hurling and is affiliated with Lyre Gaelic Football Club from the same parish. Founded in 1887, the club competes in the Duhallow Junior A Hurling Championship. 

Banteer is a dual clubs, competing in a similar level in both football and hurling. However, the hurling team has experienced more success, winning the Duhallow Junior A Hurling Championship on 8 occasions, most recently in 2017. By comparison, the football team has won the Duhallow Junior A Football Championship on 3 occasions (2 under the name of Lyre), most recently in 2013. Banteer won the 2006 Duhallow Junior A Hurling Championship and lost to eventual winners Kilworth in the Quarter-Finals of the 2006 Cork Junior A Hurling Championship.

The club's main rivals are Kanturk, Kilbrin and Dromtarriffe who are all situated close to Banteer. The club's home colours are red and white with white shorts and red socks. Having won eight Duhallow titles and runners-up on a record 13 occasions, the club is the fifth-most successful club in the championship.

Hurling

Overview
The club was formed in 1887 and entered the Duhallow Championship when it was founded in 1933. Banteer won their first Duhallow Junior Hurling Championship in 1938 defeating Dromahane in the final. The club has won 8 Duhallow Championship finals and lost 13.

2006 
Banteer defeated Freemount in the duhallow final to claim their seventh title. Banteer lost to Kilworth who went on to win the 2006 Cork Junior A Hurling Championship.

County Championship

2017 
Their most recent championship win was against Kilbrin in 2017. Banteer met Seandun runners-up Brian Dillons in the first round of the 2017 Cork Junior A Hurling Championship. Banteer lost an exciting game to a Brian Dillons side that reached the final that year.

County Championship

List of Duhallow JAHC Finals

Football 

Banteer briefly fielded a football team under their name and won a Duhallow Football Championship but shortly went under the name of Lyre and won 2 more Duhallow Championships.

Camogie

Camogie honours

 County Junior C League Winners (1): 2014
 County Junior C Championship Winners (1): 2014
 County Junior B Championship Winners (1): 2015
 County Junior A League Winners (1): 2016
 Minor D County Championship Winners (1): 2020

Pitch and facilities

Facilities
Banteer Community Sportsfield and complex is a community owned facility in Banteer. The local GAA club, soccer club and athletics club use these facilities. The complex has a park area, 2 pitches, 2 sets of dressing rooms, several walks around the pond and pitches, a children's playgrounds, a ball wall, a museum/exhibition area with a shop and there is accessibility offered by Banteer railway station.

It is the first community-owned, full size, multi-use astro-turf pitch in Munster.

Main pitch
The original main pitch is usually used for club matches. There is a small stand which can hold up to 200 people and a clubhouse which is under the stand that's adjacent to the pitch. The clubhouse includes 4 changing rooms with showers, an equipment room and a kitchen.

The main pitch has hosted several Duhallow Championship matches and finals, including the 2021 hurling final. The pitch has also hosted a number of matches in the Cork Premier Senior Hurling Championship and the Cork Premier Senior Football Championship, most recently hosting Blackrock and Charleville in 2021.

Astro pitch
In 2020, the first phase of a €1.5million project to develop a suite of world-class sporting facilities in the village of Banteer was completed. In February 2020, the Banteer Community Sportsfield Project was awarded a grant under the Rural Regeneration and Development Fund. With this grant an astro-turf pitch was built over an existing secondary pitch at the sports complex which was usually used for training. The new Astro is still used for training and hosts some matches.

The facility is available year-round for use by a range of different sports clubs across Cork county, west Limerick and east Kerry. The pitch is lined out for soccer and a lot of soccer clubs in Duhallow use this facility as well as the local soccer club in Banteer.

Rivalries

Kanturk 
Banteers rivals historically have been Kanturk, especially in the 1980s but the matches against Kanturk became rare after Kanturk got promoted. In 2016, Kanturk's second team entered the Duhallow Championship, reviving the rivalry.

Kilbrin 
Banteer have met Kilbrin in a lot of Duhallow Finals down the years. The rivalry peaked in the 2000s and 2010s. 6 of Banteers 13 Duhallow Final loses have came against Kilbrin but won their most recent meeting in the final in 2017.

Dromtarriffe 
For a large part of their history, Dromtarriffe did not field a Junior A team but since 2016, the rivalry has developed as Dromtarriffe got promoted from Junior B. As the clubs are so close, sometimes they amalgamate underage which makes the fixture more meaningful.

Notable players
Double Olympic gold medalist Dr.  was a midfielder on the Banteer football team, while he also lined out with the Banteer hurling team. A statue was erected of Dr. "Pat" at the Banteer GAA grounds in January 2007.

Honours

County

 Cork Minor B Hurling Championship
 Winners (1): 1987

Duhallow

 Duhallow Junior A Hurling Championship 
  Winners (8): 1938, 1952, 1955, 1956, 1957, 1995, 2006, 2017
  Runners-Up (13): 1937, 1953, 1962, 1989, 1991, 1992, 1998, 1999, 2008, 2009, 2012, 2014, 2016
 Duhallow Junior A Football Championship
  Winners (1): 1937 
 Duhallow Senior Hurling Cup 
  Runners-up (2): 2021, 2022
Duhallow Junior B Hurling League 
  Winners (1): 2022 
North Cork U16 B Hurling Championship
  Winners (1): 2016

See also
 Banteer
 Lyre GAA

References

Gaelic games clubs in County Cork
Gaelic football clubs in County Cork